Joyce Cheng Yan-yee (born 30 May 1987) is a Hong Kong Canadian singer and actress based in Hong Kong. She is the daughter of late Hong Kong comedian Lydia Shum and singer/actor Adam Cheng.

Career 
Cheng is of Sze Yup ancestry through her father's side and Shanghainese through her mother's side. She has been the focus of a variety of media articles due to her struggles with her weight. At a young age, she was 226.5 lbs. Determined to overcome her weight issues, Cheng started a strict fitness regimen at the age of 16. Her fitness programme was recorded in her book, My Weight Loss Diary.

In 2005, Cheng played the part of Snow White in the Hong Kong Disneyland opening ceremony.

Cheng's first music video, 靠自己, "Kaau Zi Gei" (literally Depend on Myself) aired on the TVB prime time show Scoop in 2006.

In 2007 Cheng performed in the Tung Wah charity fundraising telethon, raising HK$310,000, which included a special HK$10,000 from her mother, Lydia Shum.

In February 2007, Cheng performed in the Chinese opera, The Grand Stage.

Cheng recorded and showcased her music video, Connected Hearts on an October 2007 episode of the popular Hong Kong television show, Enjoy Yourself Tonight''.

Cheng released her debut album on 6 January 2011.

On 26 February 2008, together with Sam Sullivan, mayor of the City of Vancouver, Cheng agreed to proclaim the following 1 June (her mother's Chinese birthday) to be "Fei Fei Day".

On 10 May 2008, Cheng performed a part originally played by her mother, in a performance from Lai Fa Palace during the 2008 Po Leung Kuk Charity Gala. She also did charity work to mark that year's Mothers Day, the first since her mother died.

Cheng took part in the 512 Fundraising Campaign to help support the victims of the Sichuan disaster. She spoke on stage about how a young mother in Sichuan had sheltered her baby from the falling rubble with her own body and remarked on how noble this self-sacrifice was. She said that she had just experienced her first Mother's Day without her own mother, but she knows that wherever her mother is, she will still be supporting her. She felt that in the same way, this young mother would still be supporting her child because the love of motherhood is great until the end. She hopes that the orphans would remember this and grow up as happy people.

On 25 July 2008, Cheng took part in a live radio show with fellow Hong Kong artiste Hins Cheung. The radio show was part of Ming Pao Weekly's 40th birthday celebrations. During the outside broadcast on Metro Radio, Joyce and Hins sang an English a Capella duet live. The response from fans was overwhelmingly positive. Hins praised Cheng's musical talent and added that he hopes they will be able to perform together on stage in the future.

In September 2008, Cheng launched her acting career on the hit TVB sitcom "Off Pedder" (畢打自己人). Cheng's character, Joyce Yu, was a recurring role on the sitcom which ran for 337 episodes. Cheng also sang the ending theme to the show, "No One Is Perfect" (無人完美).

In March 2010, Cheng began filming a twenty episode drama with TVB, playing the sidekick to famed TVB actor Bosco Wong in the drama "Isolated Seven Day Romance" (隔離七日情（暫名））.

On 2 July 2010, Cheng signed to the Record Label, Stars Shine International Limited (星煥國際有限公司).

On 31 July 2010, Cheng guest-starred in "Off Pedder" fellow co-star, Cholam Wong (王祖藍)'s first stage show at the Queen Elizabeth Stadium. Cheng performed in all three of the sold out shows and wowed audiences with her comedic ability.

In February 2015, Cheng released her song, "Are You Skinny Enough?" The song focused on her experience of weight loss and regaining weight. It had a great response after being aired; Cheng said that this song is a "statement" when she won the award with this song.

In April 2016, Cheng released a new song "Girl God", which is a song that encourages the public to accept her. The song was very well received when she first released. She also directed her own music video for the first time, which won her competitors. People and many netizens supported it, and the music video reached 2.3 million hits on YouTube. Since then, the song has also been on the charts on major online music platforms and radio stations, becoming the champions, becoming Cheng's first four-channel champion song. After that, it swept the song awards of the four major award ceremonies, and won the favourite female singer music award for the first time.

In 2017, Cheng received the script to play a breast cancer patient for the film "29+1".

On 1 November 2017, Cheng ended her contract with TVB.

On 22 April 2018, Cheng held the first Red Pavilion concert "Break A Leg Joyce Cheng Concert 2018".

On 22 February 2021, Cheng released her highly anticipated single, "@princejoyce."

Passionfruit 

Joyce Cheng has recently announced the establishment of her own company, Passion Fruit Records. "When Did You Not Love Me?" is the first single released after the foundation of the label. The label will be mainly focusing on making her own music for the short run, though she may be signing fresh new artists instead should she expand the record label in the future.

The press conference was held on 26 February 2018.

Filmography

Film

Television series

MV Appearance (Actress)

Discography
 (2011) Joyce Cheng Debut Album
 (2011) 故事的配角 (Supporting Role of the Story)
 (2013) The Voice of Love
 (2016) JOYCE
 (2021) Joyce to the World
 (2023) Believe Us

Concerts

Awards and nominations

References

External links

 Joyce Cheng at Hkmdb.com
 Joyce Cheng at Chinesemov.com
 Joyce Cheng on Sina Weibo
 Joyce Cheng on Twitter

1987 births
Living people
Actresses from Vancouver
21st-century Hong Kong women singers
Hong Kong film actresses
Hong Kong Mandopop singers
Hong Kong television actresses
Hong Kong television presenters
Hong Kong women television presenters
Musicians from Vancouver
TVB actors
21st-century Canadian actresses
21st-century Hong Kong actresses
21st-century Canadian women singers
Canadian actresses of Hong Kong descent
Canadian women television hosts
Canadian-born Hong Kong artists
Media Asia Music Artists